The One That Got Away is a 1964 Australian television show.

Plot
A family leave a teaching job and a home in the suburbs. They live in a tiny shack in the bush and the father becomes a fisherman.

Cast
Leonard Teale as Major Arthur Dawson
Deryck Barnes
Janette Craig
Gordon Glenwright
John Heywood
Mark McManus
June Salter
Grant Taylor
Bob McDarra

References

External links
The One That Got Away at National Film and Sound Archive

1964 television films
1964 films
Australian television films
1960s Australian television plays
1960s English-language films